Linoleum is a material used for floor covering and also by artists for linocut prints.

Linoleum may also refer to:

 Linoleum (band), a London-based musical group
 Linoleum (EP), an EP by progressive metal band Pain Of Salvation
 Linoleum (film), an upcoming film starring Jim Gaffigan
 "Linoléum", a song by Dumas
 "Linoleum", a track on the album Punk in Drublic by the Californian punk rock band NOFX

See also
 Linoleum knife, a small knife